The Baekduia soli is a species of Actinomycetota.

References

Actinomycetota